The 2006 Sacrifice was a professional wrestling pay-per-view (PPV) event produced by Total Nonstop Action Wrestling (TNA), which took place on May 14, 2006 at the Impact Zone in Orlando, Florida. It was the second event under the Sacrifice chronology. Eight matches were featured on the event's card.

In October 2017, with the launch of the Global Wrestling Network, the event became available to stream on demand.

Storylines
Eight matches were featured on the event's card. The event featured wrestlers from pre-existing scripted feuds and storylines. Wrestlers portrayed villains, heroes, or less distinguishable characters in the scripted events that built tension and culminated in a wrestling match or series of matches.

Results

References

External links
 TNASacrifice.com TNA Sacrifice Mini Site

Impact Wrestling Sacrifice
2006 in professional wrestling in Florida
Professional wrestling in Orlando, Florida
Events in Orlando, Florida
May 2006 events in the United States
2006 Total Nonstop Action Wrestling pay-per-view events